is a passenger railway station  located in the city of Sanda, Hyōgo Prefecture, Japan. It is operated by the private transportation company, Kobe Electric Railway (Shintetsu).

Lines

Station layout
The station consists of one island platform serving two tracks. The effective length of the platform is five cars, but normally only three-car trains are operated. The station building has seven floors and with the platform is on the 1st floor and the ticket gate is on the 2nd floor. The 2nd floor of the adjacent Flora 88 shopping center (AEON Mita store) and the 3rd floor of the station building are connected by a walkway.

Platforms

History
The station was opened on October 28,1991.

Passenger statistics
In fiscal 2019, the station was used by an average of 2,693 passengers daily

Surrounding area
The station is part of the Kobe-Sanda International Park City, with the surrounding area both commercial and residential. 
Hyogo Prefectural Road No. 720 Techno Park Mita Line
Flora 88 Shopping Center (Aeon Mita Store)

See also
List of railway stations in Japan

References

External links 

 Official home page 

Railway stations in Hyōgo Prefecture
Railway stations in Japan opened in 1991
Sanda, Hyōgo